Dianthus broteri is a species of flowering plant in the carnation family Caryophyllaceae. It is native to Portugal and Spain, preferring to grow close to the coasts. Dianthus broteri is a complex of polyploid races, with 2n=2x=30, 2n=4x=60, 2n=6x=90 and 2n=12x=180 chromosomes detected in different populations, the largest polyploid series in the genus.

References

broteri
Plants described in 1852
Flora of Portugal
Flora of Spain
Taxa named by Pierre Edmond Boissier
Taxa named by George François Reuter
Endemic flora of the Iberian Peninsula